Chougha SeyfoDin (also Romanized as Choughā Seyfodīn; also known as Chougha Seifoddin, ChoughāSeyfodDīn, Chegā Seyfedīn, Chogā Seyfodīn, Choghā Seyfodīn, Chūb-e Safīdān, and Chūgheh Safīdain) is a village in Chahar Cheshmeh Rural District, Kamareh District, Khomeyn County, Markazi Province, Iran. At the 2006 census, its population was 854, in 221 families.

References 

Populated places in Khomeyn County